Egyptian Australians are Australian citizens and Australian permanent residents of Egyptian descent. According to the Australian 2011 Census, 36,532 Australian citizens and permanent residents declared that they were born in Egypt, while based on the 2006 Census, at least an additional 31,786 declared that they were of full or partial Egyptian ancestry and born in a country other than Egypt (including most numerously Australian-born persons of full or partial Egyptian ancestry). The 2006 Census shows that the majority of Egypt-born Australians are located in Sydney (16,238) or Melbourne (11,156), with smaller communities located in Perth (1,407), Adelaide (982) and Brisbane (897).

The majority of Egyptian Australians are Christians, which is in contrast to the religious affiliation to Islam of the majority of the population of ethnic Egyptians within modern Egypt. Centuries of a steady continuous persecution of Copts and conversions of the local indigenous Egyptian population has resulted in modern Egypt's Muslim majority, although the indigenous Christian Church of Egypt has retained a sizeable minority throughout its history, up until today. Christians comprise much of the Egyptian diaspora, both in Australia and elsewhere. The majority religion of Egypt before the introduction of Islam from Arabia was Christianity, and prior to introduction of Christianity to Egypt the majority religion was the Ancient Egyptian religion.

Some 19,928 Australian citizens and residents declared membership of the Coptic Orthodox Church at the 2006 Census. Most Egyptian Christians, however, may simply have declared themselves "Christian" without specifying the Coptic denomination, while other Egyptian Christians may belong to various other denominations, either born into or converted. In 2003, however, it was claimed in the New South Wales Parliament that there were in fact 70,000 Copts in New South Wales alone. An additional 1,890 persons in the 2006 Census reported themselves as being of "Coptic" ancestry. The term Coptic ordinarily refers to adherents of Coptic Christianity, but when used as a term referring to ethnicity means "Egyptian" (almost always in the context of Coptic Christian Egyptians). The 1,890 persons who described their ancestry as "Coptic" are thus most likely Egyptian Australians. Copt as an ethnonym is etymologically derived from the Greek "Aiguptious," literally meaning "Egyptian," from the Late Egyptian word "Gyptios", via the Classical Arabic "Qubt", into the English "Copt". The word ordinarily refers to Coptic Christian Egyptians, though there have been instances of Muslim Egyptians referring to themselves as "Copts" to emphasise the non-Arabian ancestral origin of Egyptians in general.

History
First history of short term Egyptians migrants in Australia dates back to 1860s to 1900 period when small groups of mainly Muslim cameleers were shipped in and out of Australia at three-year intervals, to service South Australia's inland pastoral industry by carting goods and transporting wool bales by camel trains, who were commonly referred to as "Afghans" or "Ghans", despite their origin often being mainly from British India, and some even from Afghanistan and Egypt and Turkey.

Permanent emigration from Egypt began in the late 1940s and 1950s, disproportionately so for non-ethnic Egyptian minorities escaping the growing Arab nationalist movement in Egypt which saw the overthrow of the Egyptian monarchy and the subsequent Suez Crisis.

In total numbers, Egyptian Christians were the largest contingent of emigrants to leave Egypt for other countries, including to Australia. Christians were the second largest in terms of proportion to their original community size in Egypt. Egyptian Jews, as a proportion of their original community size in Egypt, were the largest emigrant community to leave Egypt (they were the second largest in total numbers). The number of Jews in Egypt numbered around 75,000 in 1948; following the establishment of the State of Israel that same year, most of the population left, starting the Jewish exodus from Arab lands, and settling largely in Israel, USA, Europe, Latin America, with around 2,000 settling in Australia. The Egyptian Jewish population in Australia is concentrated particularly in Adelaide, South Australia. Officially, only 6 Jews remain in Egypt today.

Notable people
Aziza Abdel-Halim 
Anne Aly
Waleed Aly
Bishop Angaelos
Albert Bensimon
Jonah Bolden
Taj El-Din Hilaly
Robert Kabbas
Nick Kaldas
Naguib Kanawati
Peter Khalil
Henry Ninio
Ahmed Saad
Theodore Saidden
Akmal Saleh
Sam Soliman
Joseph Tawadros

See also

 Egyptian diaspora in Australia related topics
Arab Australians
Coptic Orthodoxy in Australia
Persecution of Copts in Egypt
Persecution of Jews in Egypt

 Egyptian diaspora elsewhere
Egyptian Americans
Egyptian Canadians

References

External links
 Coptic Orthodox Electronic Publishing Australia
 Coptic Orthodox Diocese of Melbourne
 Coptic Theological College of Sydney Australia
  (Egyptians in Sydney)
 

Arab Australian
African Australian